Erik Kalugin (July 26, 1937 – January 26, 2003) was a Soviet sprint canoer who competed in the mid-1960s. At the 1964 Summer Olympics in Tokyo, he finished seventh in the K-2 1000 m event.

References
Erik Kalugin's profile at Sports Reference.com
Brief biography of Erik Kalugin 

1937 births
2003 deaths
Canoeists at the 1964 Summer Olympics
Olympic canoeists of the Soviet Union
Soviet male canoeists
Russian male canoeists